Hermil may refer to:
 Harmil, an island in Eritrea's Dahlak Archipelago
 Hermel in Lebanon
 Hermel District in Lebanon
 Jean Hermil, bishop of Viviers